El día que me quieras (in English: The day that you will love me) is a 1935 musical film which starred the legendary tango singer Carlos Gardel, Spanish actress Rosita Moreno and the tango singer Tito Lusiardo.  The film was directed by John Reinhardt, produced by Robert R. Snody and written by the tango lyricist  Alfredo Le Pera.

Plot
The film tells the story of Julio Arguelles, the son of a wealthy Buenos Aires businessman, who wants to marry Margarita, who is considered to be below his social status.  Despite her father’s opposition, they marry and elope together. The film then traces the life of the couple and, following the death of the young Margarita, concludes with Julio’s rise to fame as a tango singer.  Astor Piazzolla, who in later life would revolutionize traditional tango, played a cameo role as a young paperboy.

Cast
Carlos Gardel (Julio Argüelles, the son)
Rosita Moreno (Margarita/Marga, the young wife)
Tito Lusiardo (Rocamora)
Manuel Peluffo (Saturnino)
Francisco Flores del Campo (Daniel Dávila)
José Luis Tortosa (Pedro Dávila)
Fernando Adelantado (Carlos Argüelles, the father)
Suzanne Dulie (Pepita)
Celia Villa (Juanita)
Agustín Cornejo (guitar player)
Alberto Infanta (policeman)
Astor Piazzolla (newspaper boy)

Songs
The film features the following songs all with music by Carlos Gardel and lyrics by  Alfredo Le Pera:

Suerte negra - a country waltz sung as a trio by  Carlos Gardel, Tito Lusiardo  and Manuel Peluffo.
Sol tropical - a rumba.
El día que me quieras - a tango sung as a duet in the final part of the film by Carlos Gardel y Rosita Moreno.
Sus ojos se cerraron - a tango.
Guitarra, guitarra mía - a country song.
Volver - a tango.

References
Piazzolla, Ástor. A Memoir, Natalio Gorin, Amadaeus, 2001.

External links
 
 

1935 films
Tango films
1930s musical drama films
American black-and-white films
American musical drama films
1930s romantic musical films
Spanish-language American films
1935 drama films
1930s Spanish-language films
1930s American films